MV Queen of Alberni is a  that operates between Horseshoe Bay and Departure Bay in British Columbia. She is part of the BC Ferries fleet.

Construction and operation
Queen of Alberni was built by Vancouver Shipyards Co. Ltd. in North Vancouver, British Columbia in 1976. She joined the other two  ferries, Queen of Coquitlam and Queen of Cowichan, that were also built in that year, with the other two C-class ferries, Queen of Surrey and Queen of Oak Bay, joining later.

Queen of Alberni was different from the others, as she only had one car deck designed to carry overheight vehicles. Her lack of an upper car deck put its capacity at 145 overheight vehicles. The ferry's high truck capacity made her a natural for the service's Tsawwassen-Duke Point route (established in 1990 as the Mid-Island Express, running between Tsawwassen and Departure Bay; and later between Tsawwassen and Duke Point), which is intended for a high volume of overheight vehicles. The Queen of Alberni services the Horseshoe Bay to Departure Bay route, alongside the Duke Point to Tsawwassen route  as of January 2023. This former route is also served by the Queen of Cowichan and the Queen of Oak Bay. In 1984, the ship was stretched and lifted, gaining an upper car deck for non-overheight vehicles, leading to a new vehicle capacity of 292. In 1999, the ship underwent another refit in Victoria.

The ship has a different system of ship evacuation since it carries fewer passengers. All of the lifejackets are stored in large containers scattered throughout the two passenger decks. The ship has two evacuation stations on each side of the passenger deck. The combined capacity of these four stations is 1,200.

In 2007, Queen of Alberni completed a 40 million dollar mid-life upgrade which will prepare the 31-year-old vessel for another 20 years of service.

Accidents
In 1979, the vessel ran aground in Active Pass. Many cars and trucks were damaged when the ship tilted over, and some flipped over completely. There were no major injuries, and the only casualty was a racehorse that was being transported. Misfortune struck again in 1989 when ship smashed into the dock at the Departure Bay terminal in Nanaimo. Six people were injured.

Another accident would come on March 12, 1992. At around 8:00am Queen of Alberni left the Tsawwassen terminal with heavy fog and almost zero visibility. The Japanese bulk carrier Shinwa Maru left the Westshore Terminal No. 1 at nearby Roberts Bank, British Columbia at 7:40am. At 8:06am the two ships made radio contact after seeing each other on radar to arrange a safe passage. At 8:08am the two vessels collided. Two people aboard Queen of Alberni were seriously injured, while none aboard Shinwa Maru were injured. Queen of Alberni had minor damage to the hull and some of the cafeteria equipment was displaced. Shinwa Maru, however, was damaged when the ferry penetrated the #1 cargo hold and ballast tanks.

On December 15, 2001, Queen of Alberni got caught in a heavy wind storm which turned a regular 2-hour crossing into a -hour ordeal.

References

C-class ferries
Ships built in British Columbia
1976 ships